Beaulieu, from the French for "beautiful place", may refer to:

Places

Belgium
 Beaulieu metro station in Brussels

Canada
 Beaulieu, or Lougheed House, a mansion in Calgary, Alberta

England
 Beaulieu, Hampshire, a village in the New Forest
 Beaulieu Abbey, located in Beaulieu, Hampshire
 Beaulieu Liberty, an obsolete district in Hampshire; see 
 Beaulieu River, running through Beaulieu, Hampshire
 Palace of Beaulieu, Essex, a former palace built by Henry VIII
 RAF Beaulieu, former RAF airfield located on Beaulieu Heath

France
 Beaulieu, Ardèche, in the Ardèche département
 Beaulieu, Calvados, in the Calvados département
 Beaulieu, Cantal, in the Cantal département
 Beaulieu, Côte-d'Or, in the Côte-d'Or département
 Beaulieu, Hérault, in the Hérault département
 Beaulieu, Indre, in the Indre département
 Beaulieu, Isère, in the Isère département
 Beaulieu, Haute-Loire, in the Haute-Loire département
 Beaulieu, Nièvre, in the Nièvre département
 Beaulieu, Orne, in the Orne département
 Beaulieu, Puy-de-Dôme, in the Puy-de-Dôme département
 Beaulieu-en-Argonne in the Meuse département
 Beaulieu-les-Fontaines in the Oise département
 Beaulieu-lès-Loches in the Indre-et-Loire département
 Beaulieu-sous-la-Roche, in the Vendée département
 Beaulieu-sous-Parthenay, in the Deux-Sèvres département
 Beaulieu-sur-Dordogne, in the Corrèze département
 Beaulieu-sur-Layon, in the Maine-et-Loire département
 Beaulieu-sur-Loire, in the Loiret département
 Beaulieu-sur-Mer, in the Alpes-Maritimes département
 Beaulieu-sur-Oudon, in the Mayenne département
 Beaulieu-sur-Sonnette, in the Charente département
 Château de Beaulieu, Saumur, in the Maine-et-Loire département

Ireland
 Beaulieu House and Gardens, Drogheda, County Louth

Singapore
 The Beaulieu House, Sembawang Park

Switzerland
 Palais de Beaulieu, a convention centre in Lausanne
 Beaulieu Castle, in Lausanne

United States
 Beaulieu, Georgia
 Beaulieu, Minnesota
 Beaulieu House, Newport, an Astor (later Vanderbilt) home in Newport, Rhode Island
 Beaulieu Lake, a lake in Minnesota
 Beaulieu Township, Mahnomen County, Minnesota

Companies
 Beaulieu (company), a French motion picture camera manufacturer
 Beaulieu International Group, a Belgian textile manufacturing group
 Beaulieu Vineyard, a winery in Rutherford, California

Other uses
 Beaulieu (surname)
 Simca Beaulieu, a French car

See also
 
 Beauly, a town in Inverness-shire, Scotland